The Northern Ireland Forum for Political Dialogue was a body set up in 1996 as part of a process of negotiations that eventually led to the Good Friday Agreement in 1998.

The forum was elected, with five members being elected for each Westminster Parliamentary constituency for Northern Ireland, under the D'Hondt method of party-list proportional representation.  There was also a "topup" of two seats for the ten parties polling most votes; this ensured that two loyalist parties associated with paramilitary groups were represented.  See members of the Northern Ireland Forum for a complete list.

Election results

The results of the election were:

All parties shown.

Note: The Democratic Unionist Party was listed on the ballot paper as "Democratic Unionist Party DUP Ian Paisley"

List candidates
Top-up candidates were elected from lists supplied by each party.  The highest-placed candidates who had not already won election through a constituency won the top-up seats.  In the table below, the top-up candidates elected through the regional list are shown in bold, while candidates elected in constituencies are shown in italics.  Candidates in normal type were not elected.

Votes summary

Seats summary

References

Bibliography
Northern Ireland (Entry to Negotiations, etc) Act 1996
 The 1996 Forum Elections and the Peace Process by Nicholas Whyte

External links
Official site
Outline Results

General elections in Northern Ireland
History of Northern Ireland
May 1996 events in the United Kingdom
1996 elections in Northern Ireland